Clavering may refer to:

Places 
Clavering, Essex, a village in England
Clavering, Ontario, a community in Georgian Bluffs, Ontario, Canada
Clavering hundred, a hundred comprising settlements in Essex and Norfolk in England
Clavering Island, an island in the Atlantic Ocean, part of Greenland

People with the surname
Alan Napier (born Alan Napier-Clavering, 1903), British character actor
 John Clavering (disambiguation)

See also
The Claverings, a novel by Anthony Trollope